Marine Parade is a musical play by the playwright Simon Stephens with music by Mark Eitzel.  It was premiered in the 2010 Brighton Festival.

It is set in a hotel on Marine Parade on Brighton's seafront and follows the lives of five couples that stay there for a weekend.  The original songs were written by Mark Eitzel.

References 

http://entertainment.timesonline.co.uk/tol/arts_and_entertainment/stage/theatre/article7126282.ece

Plays by Simon Stephens
2010 plays